Head to the Sky is the fourth studio album by American band Earth, Wind & Fire, released in May 1973 on  Columbia Records.  The album rose to No. 2 on the Billboard Top Soul Albums chart and No. 27 on the Billboard 200 chart. Head to the Sky has also been certified Platinum in the US by the RIAA.

Overview
Head to the Sky was produced by Joe Wissert with bandleader Maurice White serving as a musical director on the album. The LP was also recorded at Clover Recorders Studios, Hollywood, California.

Singles
"Evil" peaked at No. 19 on the Billboard Adult Contemporary Songs chart and No. 25 on the Billboard Hot Soul Songs chart. "Keep Your Head to the Sky" also reached No. 23 on the Billboard Hot Soul Songs chart.

Critical reception

Vince Aletti of Rolling Stone declared "Been having a lot of music dreams lately but this one’s not too surprising since I’ve been playing the Earth, Wind & Fire album pretty constantly for the past week, certainly beyond all expectations. With a cover like this one — the eight men in the group shirtless, the one woman all in white, surrounded by a starburst arrangement of cut flowers, repeated with slight variations in the centerfold — I’m surprised I even broke the shrinkwrap. And this group started in Chicago?".
Billboard noted that the band "does everything well" on the LP. Robert Christgau of the Village Voice gave a B− grade saying "Most of the first side keeps up the good work..But the mood jazz excursion on side two exposes White's essential fatuousness. "Zanzibar," it's called, as befits a travelogue; its saxophone solo (by Ronnie Laws's replacement, Andrew Woolfolk) could make Alice Coltrane blush." 
Alex Henderson of Allmusic called Head to the Sky an "excellent" album. 
Variety also described the record as "a movin' new package.

Issac Hayes called Head to the Sky one of Earth, Wind & Fire's five essential recordings.

Erykah Badu paid tribute to the album in the music video of her 2008 single "Honey".

Track listing

Personnel
Verdine White – vocals, bass, percussion
Philip Bailey – vocals, congas, percussion
Maurice White – vocals, drums, kalimba, leader
Jessica Cleaves – vocals
Johnny Graham – guitar, percussion
Al McKay – guitar, sitar, percussion
Larry Dunn – clarinet, piano, organ
Ralph Johnson – drums, percussion
Andrew Woolfolk – soprano saxophone, flute
Oscar Braschear – guest trumpet on "Zanzibar"

Charts and Certifications

Weekly charts

Year-end charts

Certifications

References

1973 albums
Albums produced by Joe Wissert
Columbia Records albums
Earth, Wind & Fire albums